Hans-Jürgen "Hansi" Gnad (born 4 June 1963) is a retired German professional basketball player and coach. He represented the senior German national basketball team, and played in the German League team Bayer Giants Leverkusen (1995–1997, 1999–2001). He also worked as the head coach of the Giants Düsseldorf.

College career
Gnad played college basketball at the University of Alaska Anchorage. In 2001, Gnad was named to the inaugural Alaska Anchorage sports hall of fame.

Professional career
Gnad was he drafted in the 3rd round of the 1987 NBA Draft, by the Philadelphia 76ers. Instead of signing with Philadelphia, Gnad returned to Germany, and began playing professional with BSC Saturn Köln. His player rights were selected in the 1988 NBA Expansion Draft, by the Miami Heat, with whom he also did not play.

National team career
Gnad was one of the leaders of the senior German national basketball team for 10 years, including captaining it at the 1992 Summer Olympics. He also helped lead the German squad to win the gold medal at the 1993 EuroBasket.

Personal life
Gnad is married to handball player Silke Gnad.

Head Coaching Record 

|-
| align="left" |Bayer Giants Leverkusen
| align="left" |2018-19
|31||29||2||.9355 || align="center"| Won German ProB championship
|-
| align="left" |Bayer Giants Leverkusen
| align="left" |2019-20
|27||14||13||.5185 || align="center"| 
|-
| align="left" |Bayer Giants Leverkusen
| align="left" |2020-21
|35||23||12||.6571 || align="center"| 
|-
| align="left" |Bayer Giants Leverkusen
| align="left" |2021-22
|32||19||13||.5938 || align="center"| 
|-class="sortbottom"
| align="center" colspan=2|Career||125|||85|||40||.6800||

References

External links
 Italian League profile

1963 births
Living people
Alaska Anchorage Seawolves men's basketball players
Alba Berlin players
Basketball players at the 1992 Summer Olympics
Bayer Giants Leverkusen players
BSC Saturn Köln players
Centers (basketball)
FIBA EuroBasket-winning players
German basketball coaches
German men's basketball players
German expatriate basketball people in Spain
German expatriate basketball people in the United States
Liga ACB players
Medi Bayreuth players
Miami Heat expansion draft picks
Olympic basketball players of Germany
Philadelphia 76ers draft picks
Power forwards (basketball)
Real Madrid Baloncesto players
Scaligera Basket Verona players
Sportspeople from Darmstadt
1986 FIBA World Championship players
1994 FIBA World Championship players
West German expatriate sportspeople in the United States
West German sportsmen
German expatriate basketball people in Italy